Dasika Durga Prasada Rao is an Indian geoscientist and the former director of the National Remote Sensing Agency. Born in 1939 to a family of Guntur-Vijayawada region. He is a 1998 Fellow of the National Academy of Sciences, India. Rao was honored by the Government of India, in 2001, with the fourth highest Indian civilian award of Padma Shri. Two years later, he received the Bhaskara Award from the Indian Society of Remote Sensing in 2003.

See also

 National Remote Sensing Agency
 National Academy of Sciences, India

References

External links

Recipients of the Padma Shri in science & engineering
20th-century Indian physicists
1939 births
Scientists from Hyderabad, India
Living people
Telugu people
People from Guntur
Indian geologists